Kaena Point Space Force Station is a United States Space Force installation in Kaena Point on the island of Oahu in Hawaii. It is a remote tracking station of the Satellite Control Network responsible for tracking satellites in orbit, many of which support the United States Department of Defense, receiving and processing data and in turn, enabling control of satellites by relaying commands from control centers. 

The station originally opened in 1959 to support the Corona reconnaissance program.

Detachment 3, 21st Space Operations Squadron, part of Space Delta 6, operates Hawaii Tracking Station on the site. It was constructed in 1959, one of three built that year. The two radomes are locally known as the "golf balls", and are a popular landmark for fishing vessels in the surrounding waters.

Yokohama Bay State Park is at the base of the ridge, with a hiking trail that goes to the point and around to the northern side of the ridge, to Mokuleia Beach. Permits to enter through the station to hike, hunt, or camp on the surrounding State lands can be obtained from the Hawaii Department of Land and Natural Resources in downtown Honolulu.

On 16 June 2021, it was renamed from Kaena Point Satellite Tracking Station to Kaena Point Space Force Station.

References

External links
Permission form
Historic American Engineering Record (HAER) documentation, filed under Ka'ena Point, Wai'anae Mountains above Keawaula Bay, Waialua, Honolulu County, HI:

Earth stations in the United States
Historic American Engineering Record in Hawaii
Installations of the United States Space Force
1959 establishments in Hawaii